Diego Antonio Reyes Rosales (born 19 September 1992) is a Mexican professional footballer who plays as a centre-back for Liga MX club Tigres UANL. He is an Olympic gold medalist.

Reyes made his professional debut with Club América in April 2010, and won his first league title in 2013. He joined FC Porto that same year, but spent a majority of his time loaned out to Spanish sides Real Sociedad and Espanyol.

At international level, Reyes has played for various national youth teams for Mexico, including the under-20 team which finished third at the 2011 FIFA U-20 World Cup. He was also a part of the under-23 squad that won the gold medal at the 2012 Summer Olympics, playing in every match. He has represented Mexico at the 2014 FIFA World Cup, as well as the 2013 and 2017 FIFA Confederations Cup.

Club career

América
Reyes rose from América's youth academy and was considered one of their young prospects. He debuted for the club on 25 April 2010 at the age of 17 in a league match against Santos Laguna at the Estadio Azteca, appearing as a substitute in the 86th minute for Ángel Reyna who scored the game's only goal. Reyes scored his first goal against Estudiantes Tecos during the Clausura 2011 tournament. He would score his second goal against Morelia in a 2–3 quarter-final loss that same tournament. He gradually cemented his spot in the team's starting eleven.

Reyes played his final match with América on 26 May 2013, playing in the final of the Clausura tournament against Cruz Azul, though only playing in 26 minutes of the match. Due to the expulsion of Jesús Molina, Reyes was moved into the midfield, but was subsequently substituted off for Miguel Layún.

Porto
On 17 December 2012, it was announced Reyes would be transferring to Portuguese club FC Porto on 1 July 2013 for a €7 million transfer fee, with half of the €3.5 million transfer fee backed by Gol Football Luxembourg as part of James Rodríguez's repurchase from Gol Football.

Reyes made his debut for Porto on 13 July in the final of the Valais Cup against French club Marseille, coming on as a substitute in the 80th minute of the match. Fellow Mexican teammate Héctor Herrera also made his debut with Porto in the same match which ended in a 3–0 victory.

Real Sociedad (loan)
On 14 July 2015, Spanish La Liga club Real Sociedad announced they had reached an agreement with Porto over a season-long loan deal for Reyes, with no option to purchase outright. Reyes made his debut on 22 August in a 0–0 draw against Deportivo de La Coruña. On 18 October, he received his first red card with Real Sociedad in the 0–2 defeat to Atlético Madrid, receiving two yellow cards in the span of two minutes for dissent.

On 8 February 2016, Reyes scored his first goal for Real Sociedad in the 5–0 away win over RCD Espanyol.

Espanyol (loan)

On 31 August 2016, Reyes joined Spanish side Espanyol on a season-long loan deal, with the club having the option to purchase the player at the end of the loan. On 30 October, Reyes scored his first goal for Espanyol in the 0–1 away win over Real Betis.

Fenerbahçe
On 25 August 2018, Reyes joined Turkish club Fenerbahçe on a three-year deal. On 1 September 2018, he would make his debut with the team in 2–3 loss against Kayserispor.

On 25 August 2019, Fenerbahçe terminated his contract.

Leganés (loan)
On 31 January 2019, Reyes returned to Spain by joining CD Leganés on loan for the rest of the season.

Tigres UANL
On 26 August 2019, Reyes returned to Mexico by joining Liga MX current champions Tigres UANL on a four-year contract.

International career

Youth
Reyes was selected by coach José Luis González China to participate in the CONCACAF under-17 Championship in 2009. Mexico eventually qualified to the under-17 World Cup and reached the Round-of-16.

In 2010, Reyes played the Milk Cup with the under-20 team. The following year, Reyes was selected by coach Juan Carlos Chávez to participate in the CONCACAF under-20 Championship. Mexico qualified to the under-20 World Cup and finished in third place, defeating France 3–1. Prior to the World Cup, Reyes also participated in the Toulon Tournament.

Reyes was selected to participate in the 2011 Pan American Games with the under-23 national team. Mexico won the gold after defeating Argentina 1–0 in the Final.

In 2012, Reyes was a part of the under-23 team that won the gold medal at the 2012 Toulon Tournament, defeating Turkey 3–1 in the Final. He made the final cut for the squad participating in the 2012 Summer Olympics, where he played in every match, including in the 2–1 win over Brazil in the gold medal match at Wembley Stadium on 11 August. At 19 years old, Reyes was the youngest squad member at the Olympics.

Senior
Reyes made his debut with the senior national team at the 2011 Copa América; however, Mexico used their under-22 squad in the tournament. He made his full debut on 25 March 2013 in a 2014 World Cup qualification match against the United States at the Estadio Azteca. Reyes also participated in the 2013 FIFA Confederations Cup, playing his only match in a 2–1 victory against Japan.

Reyes captained Mexico for the first time during a friendly match against South Korea on 29 January 2014. He was given the captain's armband after Rafael Márquez was substituted off in the second half in the 4–0 victory.

Reyes played against the Netherlands in the 2014 FIFA World Cup round of 16 match. He entered the match as a substitute for Héctor Moreno, who suffered an injury in a slide-tackle with Arjen Robben.

In May 2018, Reyes was named in Mexico's squad for the World Cup, despite being at the time in recovery from a hamstring injury, he was subsequently ruled out of the tournament after not having satisfactory progress.

Style of play
Reyes has been described as "intelligent in his positioning, comfortable in possession and strong in the air", as well as being praised for "his ability to time challenges play crisp passes and keep possession when under pressure". Though mainly a defender, Reyes has also been deployed as a defensive midfielder throughout his career.

Career statistics

Club

International

International goals
Scores and results list Mexico's goal tally first.

Honours
América
Liga MX: Clausura 2013

Porto
Primeira Liga: 2017–18

Tigres UANL
CONCACAF Champions League: 2020

Mexico
CONCACAF Cup: 2015
CONCACAF Gold Cup: 2015, 2019

Mexico U23
Pan American Games: 2011
CONCACAF Olympic Qualifying Championship: 2012
Toulon Tournament: 2012
Olympic Gold Medal: 2012

Individual
Mexican Primera División Rookie of the Tournament: Clausura 2011

References

External links
 
 
 
 
 
 

1992 births
Living people
Footballers from Mexico City
Mexico international footballers
Footballers at the 2011 Pan American Games
2011 Copa América players
Footballers at the 2012 Summer Olympics
2013 FIFA Confederations Cup players
2014 FIFA World Cup players
2015 CONCACAF Gold Cup players
Copa América Centenario players
2017 FIFA Confederations Cup players
Club América footballers
FC Porto players
FC Porto B players
Real Sociedad footballers
RCD Espanyol footballers
Fenerbahçe S.K. footballers
CD Leganés players
Tigres UANL footballers
Liga MX players
Primeira Liga players
La Liga players
Association football midfielders
Olympic footballers of Mexico
Olympic gold medalists for Mexico
Olympic medalists in football
Mexico youth international footballers
Mexico under-20 international footballers
Medalists at the 2012 Summer Olympics
Mexican expatriate footballers
Mexican footballers
Expatriate footballers in Portugal
Expatriate footballers in Spain
Expatriate footballers in Turkey
Mexican expatriate sportspeople in Portugal
Mexican expatriate sportspeople in Spain
Mexican expatriate sportspeople in Turkey
CONCACAF Gold Cup-winning players
Pan American Games gold medalists for Mexico
Pan American Games medalists in football
2019 CONCACAF Gold Cup players
Medalists at the 2011 Pan American Games
21st-century Mexican people